The 2003 Fry's Electronics Sports Car Championships was the seventh race of the 2003 American Le Mans Series season.  It took place at Mazda Raceway Laguna Seca, California on September 7, 2003.

Official results
Class winners in bold.  Cars failing to complete 75% of winner's distance marked as Not Classified (NC).

† - #88 Prodrive was disqualified for failing post-race technical inspection. The car featured an illegal air intake.

Statistics
 Pole Position - #1 Infineon Team Joest - 1:16.224
 Fastest Lap - #1 Infineon Team Joest - 1:17.757
 Distance - 432.205 km
 Average Speed - 156.684 km/h

External links
  
 Race Results

M
Monterey Sports Car Championships
Monterey Sports Car